120 Squadron is a squadron of the Israeli Air Force, also known as the Desert Giants (formerly International Squadron).

The squadron was originally formed in 1962 flying Douglas C-47 Dakotas. It now flies Boeing 707 and IAI 1124N Westwind SeaScan aircraft from Nevatim Airbase.

An undisclosed number (sources suggest seven) of converted Boeing 707 (the 707 Re’em) aircraft with flying booms operate as part of the squadron. Israel's fleet are former civilian aircraft adapted for military uses such as aerial refueling of combat aircraft and transport. Able to carry 20 extra fuel tanks while modified for aerial refueling, the Re’ems can be adapted to carry passengers as well as cargo such as military equipment and ammunition. Following the outbreak of the COVID-19 pandemic in 2020, the planes have also been used to carry medical equipment.

The Jerusalem Post wrote in September 2020 that the squadron will receive Boeing KC-46 Pegasus aerial refueling aircraft. Six months earlier, on 3 March 2020, The State Department had approved the Foreign Military Sale to Israel of eight KC-46s and related equipment for a cost of $2.4 billion.

References

Israeli Air Force squadrons
Air force transport units and formations
Military units and formations established in 1962